Wishon Dam (National ID # CA00411) is a dam in Fresno County, California in the Sierra National Forest, in the Sierra Nevada Mountain Range. It impounds the North Fork Kings River to form Wishon Reservoir.

The earthen and rockfill gravity dam was constructed in 1958 by Pacific Gas and Electric Company (PG&E) with a height of 260 feet and a length of 3,330 feet at its crest.  Wishon Dam and its companion Courtright Dam, which stands about five miles to the north, along with other smaller auxiliary gravity dam structures, are elements of PG&E's Haas-Kings River Project.

Courtright Reservoir serves as the upper reservoir for the Helms Pumped Storage Plant. Wishon Reservoir is the lower.  During times of peak demand for electricity, which is also when it is most expensive, water is drained from Courtright Reservoir, run through the 1,212 MW Helms Power Plant and emptied into Wishon Reservoir. When demand and prices for electricity are low, water is pumped from Wishon Reservoir to Courtright Reservoir using the power plant's reversible turbines. Helms Power Plant is 1,000 feet (300 m) underground in a chamber carved out of solid granite at the north end of Wishon Lake. It is similar to Southern California Edison's Eastwood Powerhouse near Shaver Lake, which is also a pumped-storage plant.

The reservoir Wishon Dam creates, Wishon Reservoir, has a maximum capacity of 128,606 acre-feet.  PG&E maintains Lily Pad Campground with 15 campsites on the southern shore, and recreation includes fishing (for German brown, rainbow or Eastern Brook trout), boating, camping and hiking. The area north of the dam that is now covered by the reservoir was known as Coolidge Meadows prior to the construction of the dam.

See also 
 List of dams and reservoirs in California
 List of lakes in California

References 

Dams in California
Reservoirs in California
Pacific Gas and Electric Company dams
Buildings and structures in Fresno County, California
Embankment dams
Dams completed in 1958
Dams in the Tulare Basin
Reservoirs in Fresno County, California
Reservoirs in Northern California